The Glades or The glades may refer to:

 The Glades (Arrow), a fictional neighborhood located in Starling City on the television series Arrow
 The Glades (Bromley), a shopping centre in London, United Kingdom
 The Glades (Florida), a region of Florida 
 The Glades (New Jersey), a nickname given to The Glades Wildlife Refuge in southern New Jersey, along the Delaware Bay 
 The Glades (TV series), a 2010 television series set in Broward County, Florida

In Music
 Glades (band), an Australian indie group formed in 2015.

 The Glades (festival grounds), a music venue in the Laurel Highlands of Pennsylvania established in 2017.

See also
 Everglades (disambiguation)
 Glade (disambiguation)